Magnagrotis is a genus of moths of the family Noctuidae.

Selected species
Magnagrotis oorti (Köhler, 1945)

References
Natural History Museum Lepidoptera genus database

Noctuinae